The Korea Atomic Energy Research Institute (KAERI) in Daejeon, South Korea was established in 1959 as the sole professional research-oriented institute for nuclear power in South Korea, and has rapidly built a reputation for research and development in various fields. In 1995 KAERI designed and constructed the nation's first multipurpose research reactor, HANARO based on the Canadian MAPLE design. KAERI is dedicated to finding a wide range of uses for atomic energy. As examples, KAERI developed the world's first radiopharmaceutical "Milican injection" for treating liver cancer.

KAERI has made significant contributions to the nation's nuclear technology development. After Korea achieved self-reliance in nuclear core technologies, KAERI have transferred highly developed technologies to local industries for practical applications. The Korea Institute of Nuclear Safety (KINS), responsible for supporting the government in regulatory and licensing works, and the Nuclear Environment Technology Institute, responsible for low and medium level radioactive waste management, are also originally spin-offs from KAERI. KAERI established the present KEPCO E&C (full name: KEPCO Engineering & Construction Company, INC., formerly: KOPEC), responsible for not only the architect engineering works of nuclear power plants, but also for designing nuclear steam supply systems. KAERI also established the present Korea Nuclear Fuel Co., Ltd. (KNFC), responsible for designing and manufacturing PWR as well as PHWR fuels.

See also
Korea University of Science and Technology

External links
KAERI website

Nuclear power in South Korea
Korea University of Science and Technology
Nuclear organizations
Research institutes in South Korea